The Hotel Van Cleve was a 12-story, 236-room hotel that stood at 36 West 1st Street in Dayton, Ohio. In 1948, Boeing engineers met there and designed the B-52 Stratofortress over a single weekend. The hotel was demolished in 1969.

The Van Cleve was named after William Van Cleave, who had established a hotel and tavern in Dayton in 1812. The hotel was financed by the Stranahan, Harris and Otis Company of Toledo and built in 1927 by Hill Smith and Company for $1.2 million. The hotel opened in January 1928 in the presence of Ohio Governor Vic Donahey,  Columbus Mayor James J. Thomas, and prominent hoteliers from across the United States. The first general manager was C.C. Schiffler, a German-born hotelier who had managed the Ritz-Carlton in New York.

In 1932, the hotel was acquired and run through the 1930s by hotel industry pioneer Ralph Hitz's National Hotel Management Company. In the fall of 1939, the Van Cleve hosted Bob Chester's orchestra for a dance music program, aired nationally on CBS radio.

Through the 1960s, the Van Cleve faced a steady decline in business due to newer more modern hotels and motels being built in the area. In 1967, the shareholders authorized the board to dissolve the hotel corporation and put the building up for sale. The city attempted to buy the hotel for apartments.

Instead, an anonymous donor purchased the hotel in November 1967 for between $750,000 and $1,000,000 and gave it to the Christ Episcopal Church next door. The building closed as a hotel on December 31, 1967. It was supposed to be converted into a home for the elderly, however this plan was scrapped when the cost for renovation proved to be too high. After the hotel was closed, its restaurant, the Mayfair, and bar, The Wagon Wheel, remained open until October 1968. After the restaurant and bar closed, the building remained empty until March 1969, when its furnishings were auctioned off and demolition began. Demolition was completed in June 1969.

After its demolition, Parking Management, Inc. opened a parking lot on the site. This was supposed to be temporary, until Christ Church could decide what to do with the site. However, Parking Management, Inc. still operates a parking lot on the site today.

References

Sources
 "Hotel Van Cleve Opens" Dayton Herald Newspaper, 4 January 1928
 Brainard Platt; "Van Cleve Hotel Up For Sale; Mayor to Make Offer" Journal Herald Newspaper (Dayton, Ohio), 28 October 1967
 "Christ Church gets OK to Buy Hotel" Journal Herald Newspaper (Dayton, Ohio), 11 November 1967
 "Alternatives Sought for Van Cleve" Journal Herald Newspaper (Dayton, Ohio), 10 February 1969
 Jerry R. Cole; "The End of the Van Cleve" Journal Herald Newspaper (Dayton, Ohio), June 11, 1969

Hotels in Ohio
Demolished buildings and structures in Ohio
Buildings and structures demolished in 1969
Demolished hotels in the United States